Stockholms KK is a Swedish swim club from Stockholm founded in 1895. They compete in swimming and water polo. The most famous swimmers of SKK is the twin brothers Arne Borg and Åke Borg. SKK organizes yearly an invitational meet named after Arne Borg, Arne Borgs minne.

Swimmers
Arne Borg
Åke Borg
Pontus Hanson
Harald Julin
Göran Larsson
Carin Nilsson

External links
SKK's official homepage (In Swedish)

Swimming clubs in Sweden
Sports clubs established in 1895
Sport in Stockholm
1895 establishments in Sweden
Water polo clubs in Sweden